The Archangel's Feather is a 2002 Venezuelan drama film directed by Luis Manzo. It was selected as the Venezuelan entry for the Best Foreign Language Film at the 75th Academy Awards, but it was not nominated.

Cast
 Iván Tamayo as Gabriel Vilano
 Roque Valero as Lazarillo
 Elaiza Gil as Fina
 Alejo Felipe as Coronel

See also
 List of submissions to the 75th Academy Awards for Best Foreign Language Film
 List of Venezuelan submissions for the Academy Award for Best Foreign Language Film

References

External links
 

2002 films
2002 drama films
2000s Spanish-language films
Venezuelan drama films